Hotel Le Marquis is a 14 floor hotel in New York City at 12 East 31st Street and 131 Madison Avenue.

It was designed by the architect Albert Buchman and built in 1907.

Singer Marion Harris died in this hotel on April 23, 1944, from a fire that started when she fell asleep while smoking in bed.

On November 21, 1955, the cartoonist and illustrator Gilbert Bundy  killed himself in his apartment there, and "his body was found hanging by several neckties from a door hinge".

In 2004, it became Hotel Chandler.

References

Hotel buildings completed in 1907
Apartment buildings in New York City
Hotels in Manhattan
Midtown Manhattan